The Museum Reich der Kristalle is the publicly accessible part of the Mineralogischen Staatssammlung (State Mineralogical Collection) of Munich, Germany.

Description 
Part of the Staatliche Naturwissenschaftliche Sammlungen Bayerns, the Museum is part of the arts-complex on the former site of the Türkenkaserne barracks.

External links
Museum site (German)

Museums in Munich
Geology museums in Germany